The Hot Choc-late Soldiers, also stylized as The Hot Chocolate Soldiers, is an American animated short film that was made by Walt Disney Productions for MGM's 1934 film Hollywood Party, which premiered on June 1, 1934. It is prefaced in the film by a scene where Mickey Mouse appears at the party, performs a brief Durante impression, and then sits down at a piano, after which The Hot Choc-late Soldiers begins to play. Due to stipulations in the contract between Disney and Turner Entertainment, the short was edited out of the film when it was screened on TNT, however Turner was able to negotiate the licenses so that the footage was included in a 1992 VHS release of Hollywood Party and for subsequent releases.

The short contains no vocals other than a song performed by Don Wilson that describes the events of the cartoon.

Synopsis 
A group of confectionery soldiers go to war against a neighboring cookie castle.  As the army parade through the city streets, Chocolate Ladies and Soldiers' wives blow kisses to bid them goodbye. After multiple thwarted attempts to enter, the soldiers successfully conquer the fort defended by a troop of Gingerbread Soldiers by using a cunning Trojan Horse shaped like a large, candy-colored pigeon.  The soldiers then take their Gingerbread prisoners to their city, but the sun beats down on the soldiers and melts them into a river of chocolate.

Production 
In 1933, MGM contracted Disney to create a "'Silly Symphony' type" sequence for the film (then called Hollywood Revue). In the contract, MGM stipulated that they wanted a sequence that was 400 feet in length and that they would pay Disney $64,000 ($80,000 if it was in technicolor) in four installments. The contract also stated that the short would not appear in 16 mm and television showings of the film and that Disney would create the musical score for the short, with MGM providing the musicians, sound effects, and recording equipment.

One of the short's original concepts was to focus on movie-star caricatures, which was dropped in favor of the song "Hot Choc-late Soldiers", which was written by MGM songwriters Nacio Herb Brown and Arthur Freed for the short. Despite the earlier contract, the soundtrack was recorded at Disney's studio. Animation for the film was overseen by Ben Sharpsteen, who guided a group of young artists that included Cy Young and Ugo D'Orsi. Production on the short occurred in the summer and fall of 1933 and a completed version of The Hot Choc-late Soldiers was sent to MGM in the beginning of November, only for the studio to return the short with a request to re-work the final scenes featuring the melted chocolate soldiers. The final version of the short was delivered to MGM on January 22, 1934.

The short is prefaced by a brief cameo by Mickey Mouse (who was voiced by Walt Disney himself), which was not initially intended to be included in the film but came about after a pitch for the character to appear in the 1933 film Meet the Baron was dropped. It represented Mickey's first actual appearance in a feature film, but was removed from the film upon its release to television. Mickey's appearance was intended to be used as a way to segue to the short, but the scene was subject to a series of re-writes as at this point in time Mickey Mouse shorts were built around "visual, rather than verbal, humor". The script went through so many re-writes that the scene's production took far less time to animate than it did to write. Scriptwriting for the scene began in May 1933 and was completed around late September 1933. The completed scene was delivered to MGM in November 1933.

Reception 
Much of the reception for The Hot Choc-late Soldiers focused upon its appearance in the film Hollywood Party. During Hollywood Party's initial release the short was seen as a highlight of a film that was largely panned by critics, a viewpoint shared by J. B. Kaufman and Roger Dooley. Critics like the City University of New York professor David Bakish and Velvet Light Trap's Allen Larson would later comment on how the appearance of Mickey and the introduction of the short felt abrupt and unintegrated with the rest of the film.

Notes 
Warner Bros. Pictures (via Turner Entertainment Co.) and Walt Disney Studios Motion Pictures (via Walt Disney Pictures and Walt Disney Animation Studios) currently rights shared of this short film as well as the feature film, Hollywood Party because of both Turner's ownership of pre-1986 MGM library and most of Walt Disney Productions classic library owned by The Walt Disney Company, which currently stored in Disney Vault. Warner Bros. Interactive Entertainment also published several Disney video games including: Cars 3: Driven to Win and Lego The Incredibles. Warner Bros. Home Entertainment also currently handled home media distribution of MGM's post-April 1986 library (under distribution licensed by MGM Home Entertainment), which already owns and distributes the studio's pre-May 1986 library through their ownership of Turner Entertainment Co.. This is also the first of few Disney animated short film produced and distributed by an outside studio.

References

External links 

 
 
 Disney Film Project, "Hot Choc-late Soldiers"

1934 films
1934 animated films
1934 short films
1930s war films
1930s Disney animated short films
Films directed by Walt Disney
Films produced by Walt Disney
Metro-Goldwyn-Mayer animated short films
American war films
Animated films without speech
1930s English-language films
1930s American films